Baldorjyn Möngönchimeg  (born 11 June 1994) is a Mongolian judoka. 

She won a bronze medal at the 2017 World Judo Championships in Budapest.

References

External links
 

1994 births
Living people
Mongolian female judoka
Judoka at the 2018 Asian Games
Asian Games competitors for Mongolia
21st-century Mongolian women